Oskar Roehler (born 21 January 1959) is a German film director, screenwriter and journalist. He was born in Starnberg, the son of writers Gisela Elsner and Klaus Roehler. Since the mid-1980s, he has been working as a screenwriter, for, among others, Niklaus Schilling, Christoph Schlingensief and Mark Schlichter. Since the early 1990s, he has also been working as a film director. For his film No Place to Go he won the Deutscher Filmpreis. His 2010 film Jew Suss: Rise and Fall was nominated for the Golden Bear at the 60th Berlin International Film Festival.

Partial filmography
 Gentleman (1995)
 Silvester Countdown (1997)
 Gierig (1999)
 No Place to Go (2000)
 Suck My Dick (2001)
 Beloved Sister (2002)
 Angst (2003)
 Agnes and His Brothers (2004)
 The Elementary Particles (2006)
 Lulu and Jimi (2009)
 Jew Suss: Rise and Fall (2010)
 Sources of Life (2013)
 Punk Berlin 1982 (2015)
 Subs (2017)
 Enfant Terrible (2020)

References

External links

1959 births
Film directors from Bavaria
Living people
People from Starnberg